Samuel Ramírez Moreno (1898–1951) was a Mexican physician and psychiatrist. He served as a professor and rector at the National Autonomous University of Mexico.

Education
Ramírez began his studies at the American School and received his undergraduate degree in 1907 at the National Preparatory School. He joined the National School of Medicine in 1918, earning the title in 1924.

Mexican psychiatrists
1898 births
1951 deaths
Academic staff of the National Autonomous University of Mexico
People from Mexico City